Ernst Antoft (1901-1985) was a Danish architect. His works include Tjæreby Parish School.

See also
List of Danish architects

References

1901 births
1985 deaths
20th-century Danish architects
Date of birth missing
Date of death missing
Place of birth missing
Place of death missing